William Graham Stanton (18 August 1917 – 6 December 1999) was a British author and radio playwright.



Early life 

William Graham Stanton was born in Brightside, Sheffield, the seventh of eight children of John Stanton (a blacksmith) and his wife. His upbringing was in a working class Methodist tradition. His later writings about his experiences as a child described an upbringing rich in love, event and interest.

Stanton's brothers, George and Arthur, were sent to Sheffield University. The depression of the 1930s denied Stanton's family the means to help him through university, and instead Stanton had to settle for sponsorship from the Sheffield Education Committee to train to be a teacher.  Shortly after he qualified in 1939, war was declared and Stanton volunteered for the Army. During the war, he met and married Dorothy Walton from Millhouses, and after the war they ran a private school together. Starting in 1954, he worked for the Vickers-owned English Steel Corporation as a sales representative. When he retired in 1980, it was as Area Marketing Manager for British Steel Corporation in Leeds. Throughout his life, Stanton wrote both prose and verse, most of which was unpublished.

Writing career 

In 1961, Stanton had a short story, It was never Albert, published by BBC Radio on their Morning Story series. It was the first of a series of twenty-one stories presented by the BBC throughout the sixties and early seventies.

In 1969 he had his first radio play success. The Compost Heap, a play about an old man who had become a burden to his family, was the first of a prodigious output of radio plays. The BBC produced and broadcast ten of Stanton's plays in 1971, more than any other author for that year. Stanton was delighted that they got Wilfred Pickles to play the principal character Albert Smith. He met Wilfred and they became firm friends. A young Tony Robinson also appeared in the play as the son-in-law Charlie.

Other plays were critically acclaimed. Milgrip's Progress was reviewed in the Listener, and by Gillian Reynolds in the Guardian. Twelve Tuesdays to Christmas was reviewed in the Listener.

In 1977, Stanton's first book Treason For My Daily Bread was published. This was a fictional work around the assassination of John F. Kennedy based on a manuscript which was supposed to be written by a fictional character, Mikhail Mikhailovich Lebedev. Stanton also wrote two unpublished books, Fallout in Arden and Moss, a semiautobiographical work.

Teaching and lecturing 

After his successes, Stanton was invited to lecture at weekend courses for aspiring writers. As a teacher, Stanton wanted to inspire rather than instruct. He placed a great emphasis on doing rather than talking. He arranged "workshops" rather than "courses," and out of this came a number of projects. One was the "Workshop 74" at St. Mary's College, Durham, and another was the "Writer's Tutorial."   He compiled much of his thinking on writing in a writers manual, published privately by Writers Tutorial, Write Through Rewrite.  This was later revised and published as "Making Things Clear."

Later life and death
In 1992, Stanton enrolled at the University of York to read English and American Literature. This gave him the opportunity to study Shakespeare properly. While at York he translated the Middle English poem Pearl for his long assignment. When he graduated in June 1996 with a two one at the age of 79, he was University of York's oldest graduate ever.

Stanton fell ill on 6 December 1999, and was taken to York District Hospital, where he died.

References

External links 
 Official site

1917 births
1999 deaths
Alumni of the University of York
20th-century English dramatists and playwrights
English male dramatists and playwrights
20th-century English male writers